Beinasco is a comune (municipality) in the Metropolitan City of Turin in the Italian region Piedmont, located about  southwest of Turin.

Twin towns 

Beinasco is twinned with:
 Piatra Neamţ, Romania (2001)
 Manilva, Spain (2009)

People
 Sebastian Giovinco, footballer
 Elio Rinero, footballer
 Elecktra Bionic, drag queen

References

External links

 

Cities and towns in Piedmont